Eurico de Aguiar Salles Airport , formerly called Goiabeiras Airport after the neighborhood where it is located, is the airport serving Vitória, Brazil. Since 9 May 2006, it is named after Eurico de Aguiar Salles (1910–1959) a local politician and law professor.

It is operated by Zurich Airport Brasil.

History
The airport was built in the 1930s and in 1943 a concrete runway and a passenger terminal were built.

In 2005 renovation works started at the airport. Projects included a passenger terminal located on a second runway and a control tower. The old terminal was converted into an international cargo terminal. The construction costed initially BRL 300 million, was paralyzed several times in 2006 and 2007 leaving construction virtually abandoned and delayed by overpricing and diversion of funds. It was finished in April 2018.

Between 1975 and 2019 in was managed by Infraero. On March 15, 2019 Flughafen Zürich AG won a 30-year concession to operate the airport.

Airlines and destinations

Cargo

Accidents and incidents
19 December 1949: an Aerovias Brasil Douglas C-47A-30-DK Dakota III registration PP-AXG, disappeared when on a training flight after taking-off from Vitória. It probably crashed at sea. All 6 passengers and crew died. 
3 April 1955: an Itaú Curtiss C-46A-60-CK Commando registration PP-ITG struck a hill 2 miles short of the runway while on an instrument approach to Vitória. The crew of 3 died.
9 May 1962: a Cruzeiro do Sul Convair 240-D registration PP-CEZ on final approach to Vitória struck a tree at a height of 40m, 1,860m short of the runway. It should have been at 150m. Of the 31 passengers and crew aboard, 28 died.

Access

See also
List of airports in Brazil

References

External links

Airports in Espírito Santo
Vitória, Espírito Santo